The 14"/50 caliber gun was a naval gun mounted on  and s. These ships also featured the first "three-gun" turrets, meaning that each gun in each turret could be "individually sleeved" to elevate separately (however, they could be linked so they would elevate as a unit, similar to the triple turrets on other Navy ships).

History
The 14-inch (356mm), 50 caliber gun was the weapon chosen as the main armament on the  when they were originally designed, but it was later switched to the 16"/50 caliber Mark 2 gun in a 1917 redesign. The ships were eventually canceled in 1922 after the Washington Naval Treaty was signed.

The 14"/50 caliber gun was designed in 1916 and entered service in 1918 on the s.

Each Mark 4 built-up gun consisted of a tube, liner, and a screw box liner with a separate screwed-on flange. Three hoops and two locking rings were also included. The Mark 6 was slightly different in that it contained a single step taper liner and uniform twist rifling. Downward-opening Welin breech blocks and Smith-Asbury mechanisms were used on both Mark 4 and Mark 6 types. The Navy encountered dispersion problems at extreme ranges with these guns in the 1920s. Several methods were used to correct these problems, including correction of range tables for errors, addition of delay coils, reduction of chamber volume, and improvement of shot seating.

The Mark 7 was designed in the 1930s and entered service in 1935. This gun included a smaller chamber, a shell-centering cone, a single-slope band seat, uniform rifling, and a tube locking ring. The Mark 11 was introduced later, with chromium plating added to the bore. New Mexico- and Tennessee-class battleships were rearmed with 14"/50 Mark 11 guns, with the Tennessee receiving the upgrade in 1942. The dispersion problems that existed with Marks 4 and 6 were corrected with these guns.

A newer version of the 14"/50 caliber gun, Mark B, was designed in 1937. It was the original gun intended for use on the s. Although it was simpler and lighter than the older versions, the Mark B was the most powerful 14 inch weapon ever designed by the United States. However, the prototype of this gun was not completed because the 14 inch treaty limit was rescinded in 1937 which allowed the new battleships to be armed with 16 inch guns.

Naval action 
Although both Tennessee and California were damaged during the attack on Pearl Harbor, both of these ships' guns, along with the other three, were used in the Second World War in shore bombardment duty. Mississippi, Tennessee, and California all participated in the last line battle to date: the Battle of Surigao Strait. As shore bombardment platforms, these five battleships participated in all phases of the war, such as the Aleutian Islands Campaign (Idaho, Tennessee), the Battle of Kwajalein (New Mexico, Mississippi, Idaho, Tennessee), and the Battle of Guam (New Mexico, Idaho, Tennessee, California).

Naval service

Railway artillery

During World War I, five of the 14"/50 caliber guns served as railway guns on the Western Front in France. Gun No. 119L2, a Mark 2 gun on a Mark 1 Railway Mount No. 148, is located at the US Navy Museum, Washington Navy Yard, Washington, D.C. Gun No. 19, on an M1918 Railway Mount No. 9, built by the Marion Steam Shovel Company, is located at the US Army Ordnance School, Fort Lee, Virginia.

See also
14"/45 caliber gun – an earlier American gun of the same caliber

Weapons of comparable role, performance and era
14-inch gun M1910 US Army coast defense equivalent
BL 13.5-inch Mk V naval gun contemporary British equivalent
Vickers 14 inch/45 naval gun contemporary Vickers-designed Japanese equivalent

References

Bibliography 

Naval guns of the United States
World War II naval weapons
356 mm artillery